Jun Kwang-Rak (born September 16, 1971) is a South Korean sprint canoer who competed in the mid-1990s. At the 1996 Summer Olympics in Atlanta, he was eliminated in the semifinals of both the C-2 500 m and the C-2 1000 m events.

External links
Sports-Reference.com profile

1971 births
Canoeists at the 1996 Summer Olympics
Living people
Olympic canoeists of South Korea
South Korean male canoeists
Asian Games medalists in canoeing
Canoeists at the 2002 Asian Games
Canoeists at the 1998 Asian Games
Medalists at the 1998 Asian Games
Medalists at the 2002 Asian Games
Asian Games silver medalists for South Korea
Asian Games bronze medalists for South Korea